Joe Oziti (born 2 April 1974) is a Nigerian wrestler. He competed in the men's freestyle 52 kg at the 1992 Summer Olympics.

References

1974 births
Living people
Nigerian male sport wrestlers
Olympic wrestlers of Nigeria
Wrestlers at the 1992 Summer Olympics
Place of birth missing (living people)
20th-century Nigerian people